Usa-Stepanovka (Uśı-Stepanovka) is a rural locality (a village) in Oktyabrsky Selsoviet, Blagoveshchensky District, Bashkortostan, Russia. The population was 57 as of 2010. There is 1 street.

Geography 
Usa-Stepanovka is located 71 km northeast of Blagoveshchensk (the district's administrative centre) by road. Kurgashtamak is the nearest rural locality.

References 

Rural localities in Blagoveshchensky District